Delta Correctional Facility was a Mississippi Department of Corrections state prison for men, one of opened in the late 20th century and early 21st century in the state, and operated by for-profit corporations. Located in Greenwood, Leflore County, Mississippi, in the largely rural Mississippi Delta region, it was initially operated by Corrections Corporation of America, which changed its name to CoreCivic in 2014.

The facility opened in 1996, with a capacity of 1172. This facility was closed by the state in 2002, then re-opened in 2004.

The facility was closed on January 15, 2012, due to excess capacity in the state. Prior to closing, the facility also housed about 125 county prisoners from Leflore County, Mississippi. As a result of the closing, the Mississippi DOC claimed $118 million in cost savings and cost avoidance.

Management incidents
In 2009, Joseph Jackson, serving a life sentence at Delta Correctional Facility, escaped custody while on a supervised visit to an eye doctor. Jackson's cousin, Cortney Logan of Louisville, Kentucky, used a firearm to free Jackson, and the pair fled in a rental car. Chestnut survived and later sued Corrections Corporation of America. The suit was settled for an undisclosed amount.

Logan was found guilty as an accomplice in the shooting of Chesnut.

Convicted felon Cedric Gordon was mistakenly released from Delta in mid-August 2009; his mother returned him to prison. A gang fight among inmates on July 7, 2011 left six inmates injured and 26-year-old inmate Derek Criddle fatally stabbed.

The warden at the time of closing was Raymond Byrd, who then became warden at Wilkinson County Correctional Center, also in Mississippi, until the contract was lost to Management and Training Corporation, in July 2013.

References

 

Prisons in Mississippi
Private prisons in the United States
Buildings and structures in Leflore County, Mississippi
CoreCivic
1996 establishments in Mississippi
2012 disestablishments in Mississippi